Chondropoma pictum is a species of an operculate land snail, terrestrial gastropod mollusk in the family Pomatiidae.

Distribution 
This species lives in Cuba, for example at Bacunayagua.

Ecology 
Chondropoma pictum is a ground dwelling, rock dwelling and tree dwelling species.

It has been observed behavior in the field, that Chondropoma pictum disturbed by humans has swung the shell forward as a defense mechanism avoiding attack by predators.

Predators of Chondropoma pictum include larvae of firefly bug Alecton discoidalis. On some occasions, the Chondropoma pictum emitted a protective foam which enabled them to thwart the attack.

References

Pomatiidae
Gastropods described in 1839
Endemic fauna of Cuba